HD1 is a proposed high-redshift galaxy, which is considered (as of April 2022) to be one of the earliest and most distant known galaxies yet identified in the observable universe. The galaxy, with an estimated redshift of approximately z = 13.27, is seen as it was about 324 million years after the Big Bang, 13.787 billion years ago. It has a light-travel distance (lookback time) of 13.463 billion light-years from Earth, and, due to the expansion of the universe, a present proper distance of 33.288 billion light-years.

Discovery 
The discovery of the proposed high-redshift galaxy HD1 (RA:10:01:51.31 DEC:+02:32:50.0) in the Sextans constellation, along with another high-redshift galaxy, HD2 (RA:02:18:52.44 DEC:-05:08:36.1) in the Cetus constellation, was reported by astronomers at the University of Tokyo on 7 April 2022. These two galaxies were found in two patches of sky surveyed by the Cosmic Evolution Survey and by the Subaru Telescope in the Subaru/XMM-Newton Deep Survey Field respectively. They were found by looking for objects that are much brighter in the so-called K band of infrared than in the H band (around 1.6 microns), which could indicate a Lyman-break galaxy red-shifted by a factor of around 13. For this reason they were named "HD 1" and "HD 2" (for "H band dropout", not to be confused with stars HD 1 and HD 2 in the Henry Draper Catalog.

Physical properties 
The observed position of HD1 was determined to be about 330 million years after the Big Bang. Another similar high-redshift galaxy, HD2, was determined to be nearly as far away as HD1.

HD1's unusually high brightness has been an open question for its discoverers; it has a significantly more luminous ultraviolet emission than similar galaxies at its redshift range. Possible explanations have been proposed, one being that it is an active Lyman-break galaxy, or a rather extreme starburst galaxy producing stars at a rate far higher than any previously observed. It is also considered that it may have a significant population of Population III stars that are far more massive and luminous than present-day stars. Another scenario is that it may be a quasar hosting a supermassive black hole; such a scenario would put constraints on models of black hole growth in such an early stage of the universe. A resolution to the true nature of the galaxy would likely await confirmations from the James Webb Space Telescope. 

The previous farthest known galaxy, GN-z11, discovered in 2015, had a redshift of 11, suggesting that the observed position of the galaxy is about 420 million years after the Big Bang.

Future considerations 
According to the discoverers of HD1 and HD2, "If spectroscopically confirmed, these two sources [ie, HD1 and HD2] will represent a remarkable laboratory to study the Universe at previously inaccessible redshifts." The researchers expect even further clarification of the astronomical objects, including better identifying the objects as galaxies, or, possibly as quasars or black holes, when carefully examined by the  James Webb Space Telescope, Nancy Grace Roman Space Telescope, and GREX-PLUS space missions. HD1, on close examination, may also reveal the first visible Population III stars, due to its very early age. In addition, the researchers claim that the use of the new upcoming space telescopes could help discover over 10,000 galaxies at this early epoch of the Universe.

See also 

 CEERS-93316
 Earliest galaxies
 GLASS-z12 
 List of galaxies
 List of the most distant astronomical objects

References

External links 
 

Astronomical objects discovered in 2022
Galaxies
Cetus (constellation)
Sextans (constellation)